Government Majid Memorial City College is a college in Khulna, Bangladesh. The institute was established in the middle of the 19th century. It is beside the Khan Jahan Ali Road, near the "Royal er mor".  It is a combined college offering 11th and 12th grades in three major subjects: science, commerce, and arts.

References

Universities and colleges in Bangladesh
Education in Khulna
Educational institutions of Khulna District